Luís Gonzaga da Silva (born 15 July 1946) is a Brazilian sprinter. He competed in the men's 100 metres at the 1972 Summer Olympics.

References

1946 births
Living people
Athletes (track and field) at the 1972 Summer Olympics
Brazilian male sprinters
Olympic athletes of Brazil
Place of birth missing (living people)